Alfred Maack (5 April 1882 – 14 February 1961) was a German stage and film actor. He appeared in more than fifty films from 1937 to 1958.

Selected filmography

References

External links
 

1882 births
1961 deaths
Male actors from Hamburg
German male stage actors
German male film actors